When the Angels Sleep (Spanish: Cuando los ángeles duermen) is a 1947 Spanish-Italian drama film directed by Ricardo Gascón and starring Amedeo Nazzari, Clara Calamai and Maria Eugénia. In Italian the film's title is  Quando gli angeli dormono.

Cast
 Amedeo Nazzari as Blin  
 Clara Calamai as Elena 
 Maria Eugénia as Bianca  
 Silvia Morgan as Susana  
 Ana Farra as Paulina  
 Mona Tarridas 
 Gina Montes as Bárbara  
 Camino Garrigó as Braulia  
 Pedro Mascaró as Oriol  
 Alfonso Estela as Lalio  
 Modesto Cid as Bonifacio  
 Carlos Agostí as Emilio 
 Arturo Cámara as Carmona  
 Rafael Luis Calvo as Ventura  
 Fernando Sancho as Peral  
 Jorge Morales as Víctor 
 César Pombo as Hurtado 
 Luis Villasiul as Cura Riévana  
 Enriqueta Villasiul as Dora 
 Félix Dafauce as Chas 
 Alberto Vialis

References

Bibliography
 de España, Rafael. Directory of Spanish and Portuguese film-makers and films. Greenwood Press, 1994. 
 Lancia, Enrico. Amedeo Nazzari. Gremese Editore, 1983.

External links 

1947 films
1947 drama films
Spanish drama films
Italian drama films
1940s Spanish-language films
Films based on Spanish novels
Films directed by Ricardo Gascón
Italian black-and-white films
Spanish black-and-white films
1940s Italian films
1940s Spanish films